Henry David Abraham (born Philadelphia, Pennsylvania, August 25, 1942) is an American physician. He was a Clinical Professor of Psychiatry at Tufts University School of Medicine in Boston, Massachusetts.

Education
Abraham completed his undergraduate studies in 1963 at Muhlenberg College in Allentown with honors such as Omicron Delta Kappa, Pennsylvania, where he was valedictorian.  He received his medical degree in 1967 from Johns Hopkins School of Medicine in Baltimore, Maryland. After completing postgraduate training in pediatrics at Johns Hopkins Hospital in 1968, he completed a residency in psychiatry at Massachusetts General Hospital in 1971-1974.

Career
In 1982 Abraham served as consultant to the Institute of Medicine's report Marijuana and Health, as well as to the Diagnostic and Statistical Manual of Mental Disorders, Third Edition, of the American Psychiatric Association (DSM-III-R). His research led to the recognition of hallucinogen persisting perception disorder (HPPD), and its inclusion in the diagnostic lexicon of psychiatry. He joined the faculty at Tufts in 2008. Prior to that, he taught for three years at Brown University School of Medicine in Providence, Rhode Island and was on the faculty for more than 30 years at the Massachusetts General Hospital and the Harvard Medical School in Boston, Massachusetts. Abraham also served as Director of Psychiatric Research at St. Elizabeth's Medical Center in Boston for 12 years and directed the substance abuse program at the Tufts New England Medical Center for three years.

In addition to publishing numerous academic papers, Abraham is the author of What's a Parent To Do? Straight Talk on Drugs and Alcohol (New Horizon Press, 2004). and The No Nonsense Guide to Drugs and Alcohol.

References

External links
 

1942 births
Writers from Philadelphia
American psychiatrists
American psychology writers
American male non-fiction writers
Central High School (Philadelphia) alumni
Muhlenberg College alumni
Johns Hopkins School of Medicine alumni
Tufts University faculty
Harvard Medical School faculty
Living people